Sir Eric James Denton  (30 September 1923 – 2 January 2007) was a British marine biologist who won the Royal Society's Royal Medal in 1987.

Denton was born in Bentley, South Yorkshire. He was educated at Doncaster Grammar School and St John's College, Cambridge, where he graduated with an Ordinary degree in Physics, before pursuing biophysics research at University College London. He was subsequently a lecturer in Physiology at the University of Aberdeen, and then a physiologist at the Marine Biological Association Laboratory in Plymouth. From 1974 to 1987 he was the Director of the Marine Biological Association Laboratory.

Denton died in St Just, Cornwall on 2 January 2007.

References

Royal Medal winners
British marine biologists
1923 births
2007 deaths
Alumni of St John's College, Cambridge
Fellows of the Royal Society
Commanders of the Order of the British Empire
Knights Bachelor
People from Doncaster
20th-century British zoologists